The "Kalmius" Brigade, a military unit of the Donetsk People's Republic, operates within the United Armed Forces of Novorossiya. Media often refer to it as a battalion of special purpose.  Konstantin Kuzmin commanded the unit. The unit's name comes from the river of the same name, one of the largest rivers in Donbas. On February 16, 2015 the "Kalmius" battalion was included in the sanctions list of the European Union and of Canada. Later included in their own sanctions lists by the governments of Norway and Switzerland.

History 
The "Kalmius" Battalion was established on June 21, 2014. The baptism of fire for the battalion came on 26–27 June 2014 in Donetsk, after the intervention of the Internal Troops of Ukraine. Former miners constitute the core of the Battalion, original strength being about five hundred people. The first commander was Fedor Berezin, who later became deputy of Igor Girkin.

On June 26–27, the battalion took part in an assault, which occurred without casualties; since July, the battalion was involved in the fighting near Donetsk. In August, the Battalion captured 13 Ukrainian officers, including a colonel. In January 2015, the "Kalmius" battalion did participate in battles around Debaltseve.

Organization
The unit's core comprises mainly volunteers; as of fall 2014 the unit had the following structure:

 Base – in Donetsk
 Dog squad
 Artillery group – armed with D-30 howitzers, SAU 2S1, MSTA-B and MLRS "Grad"

References

Military units and formations established in 2014
Pro-Russian militant groups
Separatist forces of the war in Donbas
2014 establishments in Ukraine
Paramilitary organizations based in Ukraine
Military of the Donetsk People's Republic